The Triumphant Empire: Thunder-Clouds Gather in the West 1763-1766  is a book by Lawrence H. Gipson. It  won the 1962 Pulitzer Prize for History.

References 

Pulitzer Prize for History-winning works